Anomotodon is an extinct genus of shark related to the extant goblin shark (Mitsukurina owstoni). The distribution of Anomotodon fossils is worldwide, in formations indicating that members of the genus lived from the Early Cretaceous epoch through the Eocene epoch, and perhaps through the Oligocene as well. Described species include A. novus, A. plicatus, A. principalis, and A. multidenticula.

See also
Scapanorhynchus

References

Further reading

Mitsukurinidae
Cretaceous sharks
Paleocene sharks
Eocene sharks
Prehistoric fish of Asia
Shark genera
Taxa named by Camille Arambourg
Fossil taxa described in 1952
Prehistoric cartilaginous fish genera